Edward VIII coins are a series of coins that were produced upon the accession of King Edward VIII. Because of his short reign of just 326 days and eventual abdication, many never entered circulation and remained only as pattern pieces.

The exact number of Edward VIII coins in existence is unknown, with the majority having been melted down by the Royal Mint after Edward VIII's abdication. Many pattern issues are retained by the Royal Mint Museum, with other surviving coins purchased by private collectors. In 2020 an Edward VIII sovereign sold at auction for £1 million, the most for a British coin. On 26 March 2021 a five pound gold coin sold at auction for $2,280,000, surpassing the previous record.

United Kingdom 
Striking of Edward VIII's coinage was scheduled to begin on 1 January 1937, one month after he abdicated in December 1936. Royal Mint reports from 1935–1936 suggest that over 200 dies for coins, medals, and seals had already been produced in preparation. These were eventually destroyed by the Mint, with only a few patterns being retained. Six four-pieces gold coin sets were also produced to celebrate the abandoned coronation; however, today it is estimated that only two complete sets remain. One in the Royal Mint Museum and the other owned by private Tyrant Collection.

Kutch and Jodhpur princely states 
Some parts of the British empire issued coins in the name of Edward VIII. Kutch, an Indian princely state was one such. Another was the State of Jodhpur although these 1936 issues are difficult to identify. Coins of Kutch carried the name of the local ruler on one side and the British monarch on the other. In 1936, the Princely State of Kutch first issued coins in the name of Khengarji III (the local ruler) and George V, followed by Edward VIII, and then George VI. Common denominations include silver coins of 1 kori, 2.5 kori, and 5 kori.

Other issues 
The country of Fiji issued a one penny Edward VIII coin in 1936 as did New Guinea. Additional issues were made for British West Africa (three values) and East Africa (two values). None of these have an effigy because of a hole in the middle of the coins, but they do carry the inscription "Edward VIII" except for New Guinea which has the cypher "ERI".

Reproduction coins 
Although no official circulating coins were produced with an effigy of King Edward VIII, several private mints have manufactured numerous replica coins bearing such an effigy. This has allowed collectors to have full range of coins for all the recent reigns.

Auctions

References

Coins of the United Kingdom
Edward VIII